Woldemar von Seidlitz (1 June 1850, in St Petersburg – 12 January 1922, in Dresden) was a Russian-born German art historian.

He studied economics at the universities of Dorpat and Heidelberg, followed by studies of art history at Leipzig as a pupil of Anton Springer. From 1879 to 1884 he worked as a directorial assistant at the Kupferstichkabinett Berlin, then from 1885 to 1918 served as an executive councilor to the Directorate-General of the Royal Collections for Art and Science in Dresden.

Literary works 
 Allgemeines historisches Porträtwerk, 6 vols., 1884–90 – General historical portrait work.
 Rembrandts Radierungen, 1894 – Rembrandt's etchings.
 Kritische Verzeichnis der Radierungen Rembrandts, 1895 – Critical directory of etchings by Rembrandt.
 Geschichte des japanischen Farbenholzschnittes, 1897 – History of Japanese colored woodcuts.
 Leonardo da Vinci, der Wendepunkt der Renaissance, 1909 – Leonardo da Vinci, the turning point of the Renaissance.
 Die Kunst in Dresden vom Mittelalter bis zur Neuzeit, 1920–22 – Art in Dresden from the Middle Ages to the modern era.

References and external links 
 
 Erler, Georg (1871–1951) at www.saxonia.com (portrait)
 Woldemar von Seidlitz at arthistorians.info
 

1850 births
1922 deaths
Writers from Saint Petersburg
University of Tartu alumni
Heidelberg University alumni
German art historians
Rembrandt scholars
German male non-fiction writers
Emigrants from the Russian Empire to Germany